is a very large database of English–Japanese translations. Developed by the editors of the Electronic Dictionary Project and aimed at translators, Eijirō is currently one of the most popular dictionaries on the Internet.

History 

The Eijirō project was started by an anonymous Japanese translator. Noting the favorable reception it received when he shared it with his friends, he started the Electronic Dictionary Project, a wiki-like structure that allowed for and even encouraged contributions to the dictionary. This resulted in a comprehensive database that grew to include over 1.66 million entries in the fourth edition.

Characteristics 

Although commonly termed a dictionary, Eijirō differs from other Japanese dictionaries such as the Kōjien by not distinguishing examples from definitions.

Access 

Eijirō can be purchased online as either a CD-R or downloadable dictionary file for a comparatively low price. Eijirō was also released from SpaceALC in 2002, and the SpaceALC version has since gone through eight revisions as of 2016.

In addition, an online version of Eijirō is provided free of charge through the SpaceALC Japanese portal.

Notes

External Links and References 
Eijirō Homepage 
What is Eijirō? 
SpaceALC  – a portal site which includes an online dictionary based on Eijirō.
Pocket Eijirō 
The Story Behind Eijiro – A first-hand blog entry outlining the history of Eijirō

Japanese dictionaries
Online dictionaries